Autoimmune enteropathy (AIE) is a rare disorder of the immune system that affects infants, young children and (rarely) adults causing severe diarrhea, vomiting, and other morbidities of the digestive tract.  AIE causes malabsorption of food, vitamins, and minerals often necessitating replacement fluids and total parenteral nutrition. Some disorders, such as IPEX syndrome, include autoimmune enteropathy as well as autoimmune "pathies" of the skin,  thyroid,  other glands, or kidneys.

Symptoms 
The main symptoms of AIE include:
 Diarrhea (frequent loss of fluids) 
 Intestinal inflammation 
 Vomiting
 Intestinal bleeding 
 Difficulty or inability to gain weight
 Rapid weight loss
 Decreased urine output from dehydration

Diagnosis 

There is a diagnostic test for AIE that looks for an antibody against the enterocyte. The diagnostic test contains the Western Blot which can identify the antibody IgG or IgA and with the immunohistochemistry can localize these antibodies. Endoscopy with biopsies of the colon, small colon, stomach, and other locations may be helpful in diagnosing. This test is done to look at the stomach and small intestines and to see what cells are infiltrating the digestive tract.  There are also documented cases of autoimmune enteropathy where the auto-antibodies were undetectable and the diagnosis was made on the basis of clinical presentation and response to treatment.

Types 
There are 3 types of autoimmune enteropathy:

Type 1: IPEX syndrome: Immune dysregulation, Polyendocrinopathy, Enteropathy, X – linked 
	syndrome, which is caused by a mutation in the FOXP3 gene. This can only affect boys.

Type 2: IPEX-like, which manifests similarly to IPEX syndrome but without recognizable mutations in the FOXP3 gene. This can affect both genders and includes a variety of manifestations of varying severity.

Type 3: Autoimmune manifestations primarily limited to the GI tract. This can affect both genders and may also be considered IPEX-like.

There is considerable overlap in these disorders, and it is often unclear how to properly distinguish between them as the responsible genes are generally poorly understood at this time.

Treatment 

Medical therapy is commonly used, most typically with corticosteroids (budesonide and prednisone). However, some patients are refractory to corticosteroids, and in these patients immunosuppressive therapy with azathioprine, cyclophosphamide, tacrolimus, cyclosporine and infliximab has been described. 
An intravenous nutrition such as total parenteral nutrition and/or a special diet may be necessary.  Hematopoietic stem cell transplantation may be curative.

References

Further reading
 
 

Autoimmune diseases